UFC Fight Night: Henderson vs. dos Anjos (also known as UFC Fight Night 49) was a mixed martial arts event held on August 23, 2014, at the BOK Center in Tulsa, Oklahoma.

Background
The event was headlined by Lightweight contenders Benson Henderson and Rafael dos Anjos.

The event is the second visit to Tulsa, Oklahoma, the first being UFC 4, nearly 20 years ago.

Jordan Mein was expected to face Thiago Alves at the event.  However, Alves pulled out of the bout with an injury and was replaced by Brandon Thatch.  Subsequently, Thatch also pulled out of the bout with Mein citing a toe injury.  In turn, Mein faced Mike Pyle at the event, as Pyle's scheduled opponent Demian Maia, also pulled out of their bout with a staph infection.

As a result of the cancellation of UFC 176, bouts between Beneil Dariush vs. Anthony Rocco Martin, James Vick vs. Valmir Lazaro and Matt Dwyer vs. Alex Garcia were rescheduled for this event. However, Dwyer was removed from his bout with Garcia and replaced by Neil Magny.

Ernest Chavez was expected to face Mirsad Bektic at the event.  However, Chavez was forced out of the bout with an injury and was replaced by Max Holloway.  In turn, Bektic pulled out of the bout in the week leading up to the event and was replaced by promotional newcomer Clay Collard.

Tim Elliott was expected to face Wilson Reis at the event.  However, Elliott pulled out of the bout in the days leading up to the event.  Reis faced promotional newcomer Joby Sanchez.

Results

Bonus awards
The following fighters were awarded $50,000 bonuses:

Fight of the Night: None awarded
 Performance of the Night: Rafael dos Anjos, Jordan Mein, Thales Leites, and Ben Saunders

Reported payout
The following is the reported payout to the fighters as reported to the Oklahoma State Athletic Commission. It does not include sponsor money or "locker room" bonuses often given by the UFC and also do not include the UFC's traditional "fight night" bonuses.

Rafael dos Anjos: $76,000 ($38,000 win bonus) def. Benson Henderson: $48,000
Jordan Mein: $40,000 ($20,000 win bonus) def. Mike Pyle: $51,000
Thales Leites: $40,000 ($20,000 win bonus) def. Francis Carmont: $30,000
Max Holloway: $40,000 ($20,000 win bonus) def. Clay Collard: $8,000
James Vick: $16,000 ($8,000 win bonus) def. Valmir Lazaro: $8,000
Chas Skelly: $16,000 ($8,000 win bonus) def. Tom Niinimäki: $10,000
Neil Magny: $24,000 ($12,000 win bonus) def. Alex Garcia: $12,000
Beneil Dariush: $20,000 ($10,000 win bonus) def. Tony Martin: $8,000
Matt Hobar: $16,000 ($8,000 win bonus) def. Aaron Phillips: $8,000
Ben Saunders: $24,000 ($12,000 win bonus) def. Chris Heatherly: $8,000
Wilson Reis: $20,000 ($10,000 win bonus) def. Joby Sanchez: $8,000

See also
List of UFC events
2014 in UFC

References

UFC Fight Night
Mixed martial arts in Oklahoma
Sports in Tulsa, Oklahoma
2014 in mixed martial arts